Dominican Republic competed at the 2013 World Championships in Athletics in Moscow, Russia, from 10–18 August 2013.
A team of 10 athletes was announced to represent the country in the event.

Medallists
The following Dominican competitor won a medal at the Championships

Results
(q – qualified, NM – no mark, SB – season best)

Men

Women

References

External links
IAAF World Championships – Dominican Republic

Nations at the 2013 World Championships in Athletics
World Championships in Athletics
Dominican Republic at the World Championships in Athletics